A clarinet sonata is piece of music in sonata form for clarinet, often with piano accompaniment.

The Clarinet Sonatas by Brahms are of special significance in the development of the clarinet repertoire. Several important transcriptions are also possible, including sonatas by Mozart, Schubert, Reinecke, Copland, and Prokofiev.

Clarinet sonatas
This list is approximately in chronological order.
 François Devienne: Clarinet sonata no.1 (1798), Clarinet sonata no.2 (1798)
 Ferdinand Ries: Clarinet Sonata, Op. 29 (1808)
 Carl Maria von Weber: Grand Duo Concertant, Op. 48 (1816)
 Felix Mendelssohn: Clarinet Sonata (1824)
 Charles Swinnerton Heap: Clarinet Sonata (1879)
 Theodore Gouvy: Clarinet Sonata, Op. 76 (1882)
 Felix Draeseke: Clarinet Sonata (1887), which also can be played by a violin
 Josef Rheinberger: Clarinet Sonata, Op. 105a (1893)
 Johannes Brahms:
 Clarinet Sonata No. 1 and Clarinet Sonata No. 2 (both 1894), which can also be played by a viola
 Max Reger:
 Clarinet Sonata No. 1 (1900)
 Clarinet Sonata No. 2 (1900)
 Clarinet Sonata No. 3 (1909)
 Charles Villiers Stanford: Clarinet Sonata, Op. 129 (1912), which can also be played by a viola
 Camille Saint-Saëns: Clarinet Sonata (1921)
 Darius Milhaud: Sonatina for Clarinet (1927)
 John Cage: Sonata for Solo Clarinet (1933)
 Arnold Bax: Clarinet Sonata (1934)
 Antoni Szalowski: Clarinet Sonatina (1936)
 Paul Hindemith: Clarinet Sonata (1939)
 Leonard Bernstein: Sonata for Clarinet and Piano (1942)
 Aaron Copland: Sonata for Clarinet (Violin) and Piano (1943)
 York Bowen: Clarinet sonata (1943)
 John Ireland: Fantasy Sonata (1943)
 Sergei Prokofiev: Sonata for Clarinet and Piano, Op.94 (1943), originally for flute, also arranged for violin
 Mario Castelnuovo-Tedesco: Sonata for Clarinet and Piano, Op. 128  (1945)
 Nino Rota: Sonata in D major for Clarinet and Piano (1945)
 Mieczysław Weinberg: Sonata for Clarinet and Piano, Op. 28 (1945)
 Herbert Howells: Clarinet Sonata (1946)
 Marga Richter: Sonata for Clarinet and Piano (1948)
 Malcolm Arnold: Clarinet Sonatina (1951)
 Bohuslav Martinů: Clarinet Sonatina, H. 356 (1956)
 Francis Poulenc:
 Sonata for two clarinets, Op. 7 (1918/1945)
 Sonata for clarinet and bassoon, Op. 32 (1922/1945)
 Clarinet Sonata (1962)
 Carlos Guastavino : Clarinet sonata (1970)
 Vyacheslav Artyomov:
 Sonata for clarinet solo (1966) 
 Confession, clarinet solo (1971) 
 Jack Cooper: Sonata for Clarinet (1999)
 Peter Klatzow: Sonata (2007)
 Octavio Vazquez: Clarinet Sonata (2009)
 Dieter Lehnhoff: Sonata Urbana for Clarinet and Piano, Op. 30 (2010)
 Jennifer Higdon: Sonata for Clarinet & Piano (2011)
 Hendrik Hofmeyr: Clarinet Sonata (2013)
 Bruno Vlahek: Sonata for Clarinet and Piano, Op. 42 (2015)
David Conte: Sonata for Clarinet and Piano (2019)

Notes

Further reading 
 Burnet C. Tuthill, "Sonatas for Clarinet and Piano: Annotated Listings", Journal of Research in Music Education, Vol. 20, No. 3. (Autumn, 1972), pp. 308–328.